Abū Barza al-Aslamī (Arabic: أبو برزة الأسلمي) was a Sahaba of Muhammad and a narrator of hadith.

He was one of the Muhajirun and was not among those who supported Abu Bakr after the meeting at the Saqifah.

References

Year of birth missing
Year of death missing
Sahabah hadith narrators
Muhajirun